Darongxi is a small village in Zhexi, Anhua, Hunan province, China.

References

Divisions of Anhua County
Villages in China